Mattia Trombetta (born 23 August 1974) is an Italian rower. He competed in the men's eight event at the 1996 Summer Olympics.

References

External links
 

1974 births
Living people
Italian male rowers
Olympic rowers of Italy
Rowers at the 1996 Summer Olympics
Sportspeople from Como
World Rowing Championships medalists for Italy